The concept of angles between lines in the plane and between pairs of two lines, two planes or a line and a plane in space can be generalized to arbitrary dimension. This generalization was first discussed by Jordan. For any pair of flats in a Euclidean space of arbitrary dimension one can define a set of mutual angles which are invariant under isometric transformation of the Euclidean space. If the flats do not intersect, their shortest distance is one more invariant. These angles are called canonical or principal. The concept of angles can be generalized to pairs of flats in a finite-dimensional inner product space over the complex numbers.

Jordan's definition

It can therefore be assumed without loss of generality that  and  intersect.

 

 

 

and

 

 

 

Jordan calls these coordinates canonical.

The non-negative integers  are constrained by

 

 

 

The set of angles  may be supplemented with  angles  to indicate that  has that dimension.

Jordan's proof applies essentially unaltered when  is replaced with the -dimensional inner product space  over the complex numbers.

Angles between subspaces

Now let  and  be subspaces of the -dimensional inner product space over the real or complex numbers.

Being related to canonical coordinates, these basic vectors may be called canonical.

 

With the above ordering of the basic vectors, the matrix of the inner products  is thus diagonal. The diagonal matrix elements  are the singular values of the latter matrix.

Variational characterization

The variational characterization of singular values and vectors implies as a special case a variational characterization of the angles between subspaces and their associated canonical vectors. This characterization includes the angles  and  introduced above and orders the angles by increasing value. It can be given the form of the below alternative definition. In this context, it is customary to talk of principal angles and vectors.

Definition
Let  be an inner product space.

 

where  is the inner product and  the induced norm.

The other principal angles and vectors are then defined recursively via

 

This means that the principal angles  form a set of minimized angles between the two subspaces, and the principal vectors in each subspace are orthogonal to each other.

Examples

Geometric example
Geometrically, subspaces are flats (points, lines, planes etc.) that include the origin, thus any two subspaces intersect at least in the origin. Two two-dimensional subspaces  and  generate a set of two angles. In the former case, both . Imagining the angle between two planes in 3D, one  intuitively thinks of the largest angle, .

Algebraic example
In 4-dimensional real coordinate space R4, let the two-dimensional subspace  be 

Then, an orthonormal basis of the other subspace  is, e.g.,

Basic properties
 If the largest angle is zero, one subspace is a subset of the other.
 If the smallest angle is zero, the subspaces intersect at least in a line.
 The number of angles equal to zero is the dimension of the space where the two subspaces intersect.

Advanced properties
 The angles between subspaces satisfy the triangle inequality in terms of majorization and thus can be used to define a distance on the set of all subspaces turning the set into a metric space.
 The sine of the angles between subspaces satisfy the triangle inequality in terms of majorization and thus can be used to define a distance on the set of all subspaces turning the set into a metric space. For example, the sine of the largest angle is known as a gap between subspaces.

Extensions
The notion of the angles and some of the variational properties can be naturally extended to arbitrary inner products and subspaces with infinite dimensions.

Computation
Historically, the principal angles and vectors first appear in the context of canonical correlation and were  originally computed using SVD of corresponding covariance matrices. However, as first noticed in, the canonical correlation is related to the cosine of the principal angles, which is ill-conditioned for small angles, leading to very inaccurate computation of highly correlated principal vectors in finite precision computer arithmetic. The sine-based algorithm fixes this issue, but creates a new problem of very inaccurate computation of highly uncorrelated principal vectors, since the sine function is ill-conditioned for angles close to /2. To produce accurate principal vectors in computer arithmetic for the full range of the principal angles, the combined technique first compute all principal angles and vectors using the classical cosine-based approach, and then recomputes the principal angles smaller than /4 and the corresponding principal vectors using the sine-based approach. The combined technique is implemented in open-source libraries Octave and SciPy and contributed  and 
 to MATLAB.

See also
Singular value decomposition
Canonical correlation

References

Analytic geometry
Linear algebra